Taylor Township is a township in Marshall County, Iowa, USA.

History
Taylor Township was created in 1871.

References

Townships in Marshall County, Iowa
Townships in Iowa